George Henry Driscoll (19 December 1893 – 14 May 1964) was an Australian rules footballer who played with Richmond in the Victorian Football League (VFL).

Notes

External links 

1893 births
1964 deaths
Australian rules footballers from Melbourne
Richmond Football Club players
People from Sandringham, Victoria